China Properties Group Limited or China Properties is a private property developer focusing on developing large-scale residential and commercial projects in major cities in China including Shanghai, Beijing and Kunshan. Its chairman is Mr. Wang Shizhong.

It was listed on the Hong Kong Stock Exchange in 2007.

See also
Real estate in China

References

External links
China Properties Group Limited

Real estate companies of Hong Kong
Companies listed on the Hong Kong Stock Exchange
Companies with year of establishment missing